"The Graveyard Rats" is a horror short story by American writer Henry Kuttner, first published in the magazine Weird Tales in March 1936.

It was reprinted in The Gruesome Book (1983), edited by Ramsey Campbell; and Weird Tales: Seven Decades of Terror (1997). "The Graveyard Rats" was adapted as part of the made-for-cable anthology film Trilogy of Terror II. In 2022, the story was also adapted as an episode, directed by Vincenzo Natali, of Guillermo del Toro's Cabinet of Curiosities.

Plot summary

At Salem, Massachusetts, cemetery caretaker "Old Masson" must deal with a teeming colony of abnormally large rats that are cutting into his grave-robbing profits; the subterranean rodents drag away newly buried corpses from holes gnawed into the coffins. One night Masson attempts to rob a grave only to see the corpse pulled into a burrow by a rat. In an attempt to retrieve the valuables Masson crawls into the tunnels after the body. After a short time he realizes how dangerous his situation is and tries to turn back, being set upon by the rats which he fends off. As he climbs back up the tunnel Masson eventually comes face-to-face with a burrowing zombie-like creature, from which he flees down a side tunnel. To escape the corpse, he collapses the tunnel behind him. He then finds himself trapped in a coffin which a rat had previously emptied. Masson asphyxiates from lack of air as the rats descend upon him.

References

Sources

1936 short stories
Horror short stories
Short stories adapted into films
Mice and rats in literature
Short stories about zombies and revenants
Massachusetts in fiction
Works originally published in Weird Tales